A xerophile is an extremophilic organism that can grow and reproduce in conditions with a low availability of water, also known as water activity. Water activity (aw) is measured as the humidity above a substance relative to the humidity above pure water (Aw = 1.0). Xerophiles are "xerotolerant", meaning tolerant of dry conditions. They can often survive in environments with water activity below 0.8; above which is typical for most life on Earth.  Typically xerotolerance is used with respect to matric drying, where a substance has a low water concentration.  These environments include arid desert soils.  The term osmotolerance is typically applied to organisms that can grow in solutions with high solute concentrations (salts, sugars), such as halophiles.

The common food preservation method of reducing water (food drying) activities may not prevent the growth of xerophilic organisms, often resulting in food spoilage.  Some mold and yeast species are xerophilic. Mold growth on bread is an example of food spoilage by xerophilic organisms.

Examples of xerophiles include Trichosporonoides nigrescens, Zygosaccharomyces, and cacti.

See also
 Xerocole
 Xerophyte

References

 
Biology terminology
Ecology terminology
Extremophiles